Shaheed Bhagat Singh Stadium is a multi-purpose stadium in Firozpur, Punjab, India. The stadium is mainly used for field hockey, and many Indian greats like Major Dhyan Chand, Gurinder Singh, Jograj Singh, Surjit Singh, and Bhagwant Singh have played here. The stadium was previously known as Nehru Park but was renamed after Shaheed Bhagat Singh.

History 

The ground also hosted two Ranji Trophy matches in 1961 and 1967. The ground was the home ground for Northern Punjab cricket team which played cricket from 1926 to 1967. The match against Southern Punjab cricket team in 1967 was the last match of the Northern Punjab cricket team in Ranji Trophy.

The stadium was one of 16 venues that were used for the 2011 Kabaddi World Cup.

In 2014, Chief Minister of Punjab Prakash Singh Badal laid the foundation for an AstroTurf surface on the ground which will help to improve the sports quality in the city. But stadium is in bad shape still, no work was done.

Kabaddi matches host 

Australia forfeited. Afghanistan won by walkover because of the unavailability of the required minimum of players for Australia.

References

External links 
 Ferozpur
 Cricketarchive
 Cricinfo
 Google Maps

Multi-purpose stadiums in India
Field hockey venues in India
Kabaddi venues in India
Sports venues in Punjab, India
Field hockey in Punjab, India
Cricket grounds in Punjab, India
Memorials to Bhagat Singh
Firozpur
Sports venues completed in 1989
1989 establishments in Punjab, India
20th-century architecture in India